John Robert William Fleming was Dean of Ross from 1978 to 1968.

Fleming was born in 1907 and educated at Trinity College, Dublin; and ordained in 1918.  After a curacies in Multyfarnham and Old Leighlin he was Head Master of Bishop Foy's School, Waterford from 1944 to 1952. He held incumbencies at Aghold (1952–56), Chilvers Coton (1956–59) and Castlemartyr (1959–78). He was also  Chancellor of Cork Cathedral.

References

Alumni of Trinity College Dublin
Deans of Ross, Ireland
1907 births
20th-century Irish Anglican priests
Year of death missing